The 1965–66 Iraq Central FA Premier League was the 18th season of the Iraq Central FA League (the top division of football in Baghdad and its neighbouring cities from 1948 to 1973), and the first under the name of Premier League. It kicked off on 15 October 1965 with its last match being held on 2 June 1966.

Al-Firqa Al-Thalitha became champions for the first time with a two-point lead over Al-Quwa Al-Jawiya and a realistically unassailable superior goal average. On 11 July 1966, the Iraq Central Football Association decided to end the league with two matches left to play following a meeting with clubs two days earlier. This was the first season that featured a double round-robin format where each team was scheduled to play all the other teams in the league twice, once home and once away.

Al-Firqa Al-Thalitha's Shidrak Yousif won the best player award while their duo Nouri Dhiab and Mahmoud Assad shared the top scorer award with seven goals each. Al-Firqa Al-Thalitha also beat Al-Quwa Al-Jawiya 1–0 in the Iraq Central FA Perseverance Cup on 9 June 1966.

League table

Results

References

External links
 Iraqi Football Website

Iraq Central FA League seasons
Iraq
1965 in Iraqi sport
1966 in Iraqi sport